A Property adjustment order is a legal order in the United Kingdom. They give a  "court wide powers to change or transfer ownership of property regardless of whether one spouse or civil partner is the legal owner or whether you are joint legal owners".

References

Link is not working

English property law